Mga Lihim ni Urduja is a 2023 Philippine television drama fantasy series broadcast by GMA Network. Directed by Jorron Lee Monroy, it stars Sanya Lopez in the title role, Kylie Padilla and Gabbi Garcia. It premiered on February 27, 2023 on the network's Telebabad line up replacing Maria Clara at Ibarra.

Cast and characters

Lead cast
 Sanya Lopez as Urduja
 Kylie Padilla as Gemma Lynne "Gemma" Davino
 Gabbi Garcia as Crystal Posadas

Supporting cast
 Zoren Legaspi as Marius "Maestro" Tan (Lead Role) / Marcel "Chairman" Tan (Villain Role)
 Jeric Gonzales as Greg Sandoval 
 Rochelle Pangilinan as Dayang Salaknib
 Arra San Agustin as Valencia Nadales
 Vin Abrenica as Onyx Salazar
 Michelle Dee as Freya Salazar
 Kristofer Martin as Ryker Gustillo
 Pancho Magno as Kenzo Diaz
 Ricardo Cepeda as Erning Davino
 Marina Benipayo as Juliana Davino
 Gina Pareño as Merly Posadas
 Sherilyn Reyes-Tan as Angkat
 Jayson Gainza as Jose
 Dave Bornea as Enrique Sanchez
 Manolo Pedrosa as Arlo
 Jay Arcilla as Garcia
 Melbelline Caluag as Nanette
 Thou Reyes as Steven "Arki" Padilla
 Billie Hakenson as Astrid Del Valle
 Via Antonio as Christine "Tin" Santiago
 Mosang as Mimang
 Janice Hung as Astra
 Ian Ignacio as Moxi
 Luke Conde as Dallego
 Michael Roy Jornales as Villaroman
 JC Tan as Nova
 Rolando Innocencio as Benjamin "Dok" Hipolito

Guest cast
 Sunshine Dizon as Iris Dayanghirang
 Rodjun Cruz as Min Feng
 Faith da Silva as Khatun Khublun
 Yasser Marta as Ibn Battuta

Production
Mga Lihim ni Urduja was first conceptualized as a graphic novel by director Jorron Lee Monroy. According to Monroy, the series used filming technologies used from the United States.

Principal photography commenced in January 2023. According to the series' virtual production director Cedric Hornedo, the usage of real-time virtual production technology was implemented for the extension of the set.

Episodes

References

External links
 
 

2023 Philippine television series debuts
Filipino-language television shows
GMA Network drama series
Philippine fantasy television series
Television shows set in the Philippines